Calvert Independent School District is a public school district based in Calvert, Texas (USA).

Academic achievement
In 2009, the school district was rated "academically acceptable" by the Texas Education Agency.

Schools
Calvert High School (Grades 9-12)

Special programs

Athletics
Calvert High School plays six-man football.

See also

List of school districts in Texas 
List of high schools in Texas

References

External links
Calvert ISD

School districts in Robertson County, Texas